Michael Kennedy Joseph (9 July 1914 – 4 October 1981) was a British-born New Zealand poet and novelist in several genres. He studied at Sacred Heart College, Auckland, and at Merton College, Oxford, from 1936 to 1939. During the Second World War he served with the Royal Artillery. His works range from I'll Soldier No More, A Pound of Saffron and A Soldier's Tale to the science fiction works The Hole in the Zero and The Time of Achamoth to a historical novel, Kaspar's Journey, based on the medieval Children's Crusade. The Hole in the Zero includes the first known use of the word "hoverboard".

Joseph was also a Professor of English at the University of Auckland in New Zealand. In 1969, he edited the 1831 text of Frankenstein for Oxford University Press; in 1980 the text was reissued in the World's Classics series.

Works

Poetry
Imaginary Islands (1950)
The Living Countries (1959)

Novels
I’ll Soldier No More (1958) 
A Pound of Saffron (1962) 
The Hole in the Zero (1967) 
A Soldier’s Tale (1976) 
The Time of Achamoth (1977) 
Kaspar’s Journey (1988)

References

 New Zealand Book Council: M. K. Joseph 
 Roger Robinson and Nelson Wattie, The Oxford Companion to New Zealand Literature, Oxford University Press, Auckland, 1998, p. 274.

External links

Review of I'll Soldier No More 
M K Joseph's War Novel I'll Soldier No More 
Cover of A Soldier's Tale (1976)

1914 births
1981 deaths
20th-century English novelists
20th-century New Zealand novelists
20th-century English poets
British male poets
English male novelists
English science fiction writers
New Zealand poets
New Zealand male writers
New Zealand male novelists
New Zealand science fiction writers
20th-century English male writers
English male non-fiction writers
Alumni of Merton College, Oxford
British Army personnel of World War II
Royal Artillery personnel
British emigrants to New Zealand